Joshua or Josh Grant may refer to:

Josh Grant (basketball) (born 1967), American basketball player
Josh Grant (footballer) (born 1998), English footballer
Joshua Grant, an American dancer with the Les Ballets Trockadero de Monte Carlo troupe